No Size Fits All: From Mass Marketing to Mass Handselling is a 2009 book by Tom Hayes and Michael S. Malone.

References

2009 non-fiction books
Business books